Wenceslau Guimarães is a municipality in the state of Bahia in the North-East region of Brazil.

The municipality contains the  Wenceslau Guimarães Ecological Station, created in 1995.
It also contains part of the  Caminhos Ecológicos da Boa Esperança Environmental Protection Area, created in 2003, which serves as a buffer zone for the ecological station.

See also
List of municipalities in Bahia

References

Municipalities in Bahia